The Blizzard of 1966 was a nor' easter that impacted the northeastern United States and Eastern Canada from January 29-February 1, 1966. Heavy lake effect snows preceded the cyclonic storm southeast of Lake Ontario. In and around the Lake Ontario snow belt, the storm period is considered to have lasted from January 27 - February 1, 1966, and the blizzard was a combination nor' easter and lake effect event in this region.

Prior to the event, temperatures plunged to record low levels in central and northern New York as Arctic air dominated in the wake of an earlier cyclone. Syracuse, NY, tied its official record low of -26°F on January 26.

 Within days, at least 142 people had been killed — 31 had frozen to death, 46 died in fires that started while people were trying to heat their home.  Others died from heart attacks while shoveling snow or pushing cars, or traffic accidents caused by slick roads.  The death toll reached 201 by Wednesday, February 2, as the storm eased.

New Market, Alabama, recorded a state record low of -27°F on January 30.

Conditions East of Lake Ontario 
Heavy lake effect snow fell southeast of Lake on January 27, 28, and 29, before the heavy snows from the cyclone reached the area on January 30. Lake effect bands continued to impact northern Cayuga, Onondaga, Madison, Oswego, and Oneida counties even during the cyclonic portion of the event on January 30-31.

Winds were more than  during the storm. The snow was badly drifted and roads and schools closed as long as a week. Drifts covered entire 2 story houses.

Sykes' measurement methodology was designed to arrive at a "true" snowfall total and account for the settling effects of the wind on snow accumulation. His methodology included estimation and frequent measurements. While Sykes methodology was certainly rigorous and scientific, it is not directly comparable to official snowfall measuring practices utilized by the National Weather Service.

The official Oswego snowfall total for the storm, measured by the cooperative observer at the State University College at Oswego was 68". Retired former federal meteorologist and cooperative observer at Oswego, Elmer Loveridge, maintained a private weather station at his home on Ellen Street in Oswego after the Weather Bureau Office in Oswego was closed in the early 1950s. Loveridge measured 71.5" of snow during the event using standard methodology.

The heaviest snowfall centered from northern Cayuga and western Oswego County inland through central Oswego County into the southern Tug Hill of northern Oneida County. Storm totals of roughly seven feet were observed in central Oswego and northwest Oneida counties. Official storm totals include 89.5" at Mallory, Oswego County, 84" at Bennetts Bridge, Oswego County, and 80.7" at Camden, Oneida County.

 of snow were recorded at Camden, New York on January 31. This is the official largest single day snowfall in New York history. The last day of the blizzard the winds subsided and snowburst conditions prevailed, with the snow falling straight down.

At Oswego, the storm lasted from January 27 to January 31, 1966, a total of 4½ days. The daily snowfall totals for Southwest Oswego, as measured by Professor Robert Sykes Jr, are as follows.

January 27, 1966: 
January 28, 1966: 
January 29, 1966: 
January 30, 1966: 
January 31, 1966:

January 22-23, 1966 
On January 22–23 of 1966, a cyclone that preceded the Blizzard of '66, impacted western New York and Southern Ontario. Toronto received  of snow. The city of Batavia and Genesee County had  of snow fall on that Saturday night alone. The only thing that prevented that snowstorm from becoming a true blizzard like this infamous one of the very next weekend was the lack of high winds.

See also
List of Regional Snowfall Index Category 4 winter storms

References

External links
 YouTube - Blizzard of 1966

1966-1
1966 in Canada
1966 natural disasters in the United States
January 1966 events in Canada
January 1966 events in the United States
January 1966 events in North America